The Malakula languages are a group of Central Vanuatu languages spoken on Malakula Island in central Vanuatu. Unlike some earlier classifications, Lynch (2016) considers the Malakula languages to form a coherent group.

Classification
Lynch (2016) divides the Malakula languages into three primary subgroups, namely Northern, Eastern, and  Western, all three of which are linkages. Lynch (2016) recognizes 32 languages.

Northern
Malua Bay
North Coast
Nese
Botovro
Vovo, Vao
Eastern
Uripiv
Unua
Aulua
Banam Bay
Southeastern
Bwenelang
Nasvang, Nisvai
Port Sandwich, Avok, Axamb
Maskelynes
Western
Central Western
Neve'ei
Larëvat
Naman
Peripheral Western
Ninde
Nāti
Northwestern
V'ënen Taut
Tape
Tirax
Southwestern
Lendamboi
Aveteian
Navwien
Avava
Nasarian
Naha'ai, Nahavaq

The Central-Western linkage is only very weakly defined, while Ninde and Nāti have similarities with both the Northwestern and Southwestern linkages.

The positions of the Sörsörian, Rerep, Vivti, and Nitita languages were not addressed.

Languages
François (2015:18-21) lists the following 42 Malakula languages.

References

Further reading

External links
 List and map of Malekula languages (A.N.U., 1995)
 Map of Vanuatu languages including Malekula
 Updated map of Malekula languages (MPI-SHH – Jena, 2018) – see presentation.

 
Languages of Vanuatu